Cantacuzino Palace is located on Calea Victoriei no. 141, Bucharest, Romania. It was built by architect Ion D. Berindey in the Beaux Arts style, having a few Rococo Revival rooms. Today it houses the George Enescu museum.

History 

The palace was built in 1901–1902 for Gheorghe Grigore Cantacuzino, mayor of Bucharest and former prime-minister, after the plans of Ion D. Berindey, in the French Beaux Arts style. After his death, the building was inherited by his son Mihail G. Cantacuzino, who died prematurely in 1929. Mihail's wife Maria remarried in December 1939 with music composer George Enescu. On 10 August 1913, at the end of the Second Balkan War, the Treaty of Bucharest was signed here. The building – known as Cantacuzino Palace at the time – also hosted the Presidency of the Council of Ministers in the eve of World War II.

After the death of George Enescu in 1955, his wife stated in her will that the palace would host a museum dedicated to the artist. In 1956, The National Museum George Enescu was established.<ref>Dan Berindei, Sebastian Boniface –  Bucharest Travel Guide ', Ed. Sport-Tourism, Bucharest, 1980</ref>

 Description  
The exterior and most of the rooms are Beaux Arts, the rest being Rococo Revival. The two lions at the entrance, and the gates and fences, in the Louis XIV style, give the building a princely look. The palace had the fame of a place in Bucharest where balls were held. For the decoration of the interiors, Gheorghe Grigore Cantacuzino turned to the most famous artists of the time: George Demetrescu Mirea, Nicolae Vermont and Costin Petrescu. Nicolae Vermont made six medallions (oil on canvas embossed on the wall), three of which were signed and dated 1907. Five of the six medallions are placed above the doors in the hallway that led to the rooms to the right of the entrance.  Two of them, Shepherd with Sheep (Cioban cu Oile) and Peasant Woman with Vessel'' (Țărăncuță cu Cofă), are directly inspired by the work of Nicolae Grigorescu, under whose influence was their author.

In present day, about only five rooms can be visited, the rest being occupied by some institutions.

Gallery

References

External links 
  Official website
  Cantacuzino Palace and George Enescu Museum

Museums in Bucharest
Palaces in Bucharest
Historic monuments in Bucharest
Calea Victoriei
Houses completed in 1902